This is a list of sovereign states whose capital is not their largest city.

List

See also 
 List of national capitals by population

References

Countries whose capital is not their largest city
Capital is not largest city